Freeport High School is a public secondary school located in Freeport, Illinois, United States.

Demographics
In the 2014–2015 school year, Freeport High School had a population of 55.2% white students, followed by 23.7% black students, 10.7% students of two or more races, 8.7% Hispanic students, and 1.6% of students grouped as "other" (Asian, American Indian, etc.). In the same year, 63.7% of the student body was classified as "low income".

Academics
In 2015, Freeport had an average composite ACT score of 19.3, just below the state average at 20.5. It graduated 82.5% of its senior class. Freeport has not made Adequate Yearly Progress (AYP) in recent years, and, as of the 2013–2014 school year, has been on the state academic watch list for eight consecutive school years. The school has been well below the state minimum AYP target in math, reading, and graduation rate.

Activities
The following teams won their respective IHSA sponsored state championship tournaments:

Basketball (boys): State Champions (1914–15, 1925–26, 1950–51)
Bowling (boys): State Champions (2007–08)
Speech: State Champions (1940–41, 1941–42, 1948–49, 1949–50, 1950–51, 1955–56)
Drama: State Champions (1940–41, 1942–43, 1948–49, 1950–51, 1955–56)
Debate: State Champions (1949–50, 1955–56)

Notable alumni
 Richard Wayne Dirksen, Fourth Organist Choirmaster of Washington National Cathedral
Dan Balz, journalist for the Washington Post
 Robert L. Johnson, former CEO, Chairman, founder of Black Entertainment Television (BET)
 Trisha Paytas, YouTube personality
 Jason Pearson, MLB baseball player
 Preston Pearson, played 14 years in the National Football League

Notable staff
Adolph Rupp was the boys basketball coach (1926–30).  He left to coach at the University of Kentucky (1930–72), leading the Wildcats to four NCAA Men's National Championships.

References

External links
Official website
http://iirc.niu.edu/Classic/School.aspx?source=AYP_Information&source2=AYP_Report&schoolID=080891450220001&level=S

Public high schools in Illinois
Schools in Stephenson County, Illinois
Freeport, Illinois